Hanaoka (written: 花岡 or 華岡) is a Japanese surname. Notable people with the surname include:

, Japanese long and triple jumper
, Japanese surgeon

Japanese-language surnames